Liberation is a 2008 science fiction novel by Brian Francis Slattery about a post-economic collapse America, where a combination of capitalist and criminal forces reshape the United States into a grouping of Balkanized microgovernments and lawless slave plantations.

A group of supercriminals known as the "Slick Six," led by an assassin named Marco Oliveira, regroup to steal America back from a New York kingpin named "The Aardvark." The Aardvark has usurped power in the wake of disaster and borrowed an immense amount of money from Japan in order to re-institute slavery and run his criminal empire from a makeshift tower of slag in Manhattan.

External links
"Liberation by Brian Francis Slattery" at Strange Horizons
"We're All Slaves Of History, In Sprawling Dystopian Novel" at io9
"Liberation: Being the Adventures of the Slick Six After the Collapse of the United States of America" at Las Vegas Weekly

2008 American novels
American science fiction novels
Dystopian novels